Heterocampa subrotata, the small heterocampa, is a species of moth in the family Notodontidae (the prominents). It was first described by Leon F. Harvey in 1874 and it is found in North America.

The MONA or Hodges number for Heterocampa subrotata is 7985.

Subspecies
Two subspecies belong to Heterocampa subrotata:
 Heterocampa subrotata celtiphaga Harvey, 1874 c g
 Heterocampa subrotata subrotata g
Data sources: i = ITIS, c = Catalogue of Life, g = GBIF, b = BugGuide

References

Further reading

External links

 

Notodontidae
Articles created by Qbugbot
Moths described in 1874

Taxa named by Leon F. Harvey